Panum Crater is a volcanic cone that is part of the Mono–Inyo Craters, a chain of recent volcanic cones south of Mono Lake and east of the Sierra Nevada, in California, United States. Panum Crater is between 600 and 700 years old, and it exhibits all of the characteristics of the textbook rhyolitic lava dome.

Rhyolitic volcanoes are characterized by having large amounts of silica (quartz) in their lava. The content of silica at Panum is about 76 percent. It makes the lava very viscous, or thick, and very glassy. Products of this rhyolitic eruption are pumice and obsidian, the volcanic glass that Native Americans used to make arrow points and scrapers.

Panum Crater formed in a sequence of events. The first event was caused by magma rising from deep within the Earth's crust. When this extremely hot, liquid rock made contact with water just below the surface, the water expanded into steam and a large, violent eruption occurred. The material that was thrown into the air by the steam, mainly old lake bottom sediments, was deposited around the new vent in little mounds. So much debris was blown out that a gaping crater was left behind.

Once this debris was blown out, a fountain of cinders shot up a great distance into the sky. As this huge amount of ash and pumice began to fall back towards the earth, it formed a pumice ring, or cinder cone, about the original vent. This cinder cone is still visible today.

Following the violent eruptions of the first two phases, the remainder of the thick magma slowly rose to the surface in a series of domes. Each dome began with an outpouring of the viscous, rhyolitic lava which hardened and formed a cap over the vent. As magma continued to push up, the cap (or dome) shattered and fell to the outside of the newly formed dome. This happened so many times that a new mountain was created out of these broken pieces, called crumble breccia. The mountain continued to build in this manner until the force within the volcano weakened and no more new domes formed. The final one still stands today.

As the final dome hardened, a period of spire building began. Thick lava pushed up through cracks of the hardening dome and formed castle-like spires. The formation of the spires was analogous to toothpaste squeezing through the opening of a tube and forming a small tower before it topples over. Most of the spires at Panum fell over and broke because of their rapid cooling and because of many small explosions at their bases. Most of the rocky debris at the top of the dome is the remains of spires that have crumbled.

The central lava dome was erupted from degassed material and is made up of pumice and obsidian of the same composition. The difference between the two has to do with gas escaping as the magma cooled. The magma that created the dome had dissolved gas in it, like a bottle of seltzer water. As the magma rose towards the surface where there was less pressure on it than at depth, the gas expanded producing the holes or bubbles in the pumice. The magma that remained pressurized while it cooled quickly or that had already lost its gas, formed the obsidian.

Flow banding containing both obsidian and pumice is common at Panum Crater. Another common texture, called breadcrust, can also be seen in the dome. Breadcrust textures form when the inside of a cooling rock is still hot with gas escaping from it while the outside surface has already cooled. As the gas expands from the inside, the outside surface cracks to allow the gas to escape.

References

 
 

Volcanoes of Mono County, California
Landforms of the Sierra Nevada (United States)
Lava domes
Volcanoes of California
Cinder cones of the United States